Kenneth Elwin Roberts (born March 9, 1988) is an American former professional baseball pitcher, who played in Major League Baseball (MLB) with the Colorado Rockies and Philadelphia Phillies. He made his big league debut with the Rockies, on May 3, 2015.

Career

Colorado Rockies
Roberts played college baseball at  Middle Tennessee State University. He was drafted by the Colorado Rockies in the 25th round of the 2010 Major League Baseball Draft.

Roberts was called up to the majors for the first time on May 2, 2015. He was designated for assignment on August 28, 2015.

Philadelphia Phillies
He was claimed off waivers by the Philadelphia Phillies two days later. He was released by the Phillies in March 2016.

References

External links

1988 births
Living people
Baseball players from Tennessee
People from Murfreesboro, Tennessee
Major League Baseball pitchers
Colorado Rockies players
Philadelphia Phillies players
Middle Tennessee Blue Raiders baseball players
Casper Ghosts players
Tri-City Dust Devils players
Asheville Tourists players
Modesto Nuts players
Tulsa Drillers players
Lehigh Valley IronPigs players